Bolholt is an area of Bury in Greater Manchester, England.

Areas of Greater Manchester
Bury, Greater Manchester